Carlos Humberto Paredes Monges (born 16 July 1976) is a Paraguayan coach and former footballer. He is the current manager of Tacuary.

His style of play led the Paraguayan media to call him the "Master of the Midfield". Paredes played defensive midfield, though he could also play as centre-forward, being a lethal header. He also had exceptional leadership capabilities on the field, where he was constantly marshalling instructions to the rest of the team.

His first major competition as a coach was the 2016 Toulon Tournament with the Paraguay national under-23 football team.

Career
Paredes started his career in Club Olimpia of Paraguay in 1995, winning five national championships and becoming the youngest captain in the club's history at the age of 20. In 2000, he moved to FC Porto of Portugal where he won the Cup of Portugal in the 2000/2001 season. In 2002, he was transferred to Reggina for €4.8million (Porto retained 25% rights to receive future transfer revenue of Reggina received). In 2006 Paredes moved to Sporting Clube de Portugal where he was allowed very little game time. In January 2008 his contract was terminated by Sporting.

Paredes returned to Paraguay in 2008 to play for the team he first played for, Olimpia. Currently, he is the team captain and undisputed leader on the field. He has scored two goals in the first three games of the Apertura tournament. In 2009 Paredes moved to Rubio Ñú due to not featuring in the plans of former coach Gregorio Perez for the 2009 Clausura Tournament. In 2010 Paredes moved to Sportivo Luqueño and to Olimpia in the following year, where is he is currently one of the team captains.

International career
Paredes played in three FIFA World Cups for Paraguay: 1998, 2002 and 2006, reaching the Round of 16 in two of them.

Honours

Club
Olimpia
 Primera División (6): 1995, 1997, 1998, 1999, 2000, 2011 Clausara

Porto
 Taça de Portugal (1): 2000–01
 Supertaça Cândido de Oliveira (1): 2001

Sporting CP
 Taça de Portugal (1): 2006–07

References

External links
 

1976 births
Living people
Paraguayan footballers
Club Olimpia footballers
FC Porto players
Reggina 1914 players
Sporting CP footballers
Primeira Liga players
Serie A players
Expatriate footballers in Italy
Expatriate footballers in Portugal
Paraguayan expatriate footballers
Paraguayan expatriate sportspeople in Italy
Paraguayan expatriate sportspeople in Portugal
Paraguay international footballers
1998 FIFA World Cup players
1999 Copa América players
2002 FIFA World Cup players
2004 Copa América players
2006 FIFA World Cup players
Association football midfielders
Guaireña F.C. managers
Independiente F.B.C. managers
Club Tacuary managers
Sportivo Luqueño managers